Windham Township is a township in Bradford County, Pennsylvania, USA. It is part of Northeastern Pennsylvania. The population was 933 at the 2010 census.

Geography
Windham Township is located in northeast Bradford County, along the New York state line. It is bordered by Warren Township to the east, Orwell and Rome townships to the south, and Litchfield Township to the west. To the north, in Tioga County, New York, is the town of Nichols. Windham Township includes the unincorporated communities of Windham, Windham Center, and Windham Summit.

Wappasening Creek flows through the northeast part of the township into New York state, where it joins the Susquehanna River. Pennsylvania Route 187 runs north–south through the township, becoming New York State Route 282 north of the state line.

Demographics

At the 2000 census, there were 967 people, 362 households and 289 families residing in the township. The racial make-up of the township was 98.86% White, 0.10% African American, 0.21% Native American, 0.21% Asian and 0.62% from two or more races. Hispanic or Latino of any race were 0.52% of the population.

There were 362 households, of which 31.5% had children under the age of 18 living with them, 70.4% were married couples living together, 6.6% had a female householder with no husband present and 19.9% were non-families. 15.5% of all households were made up of individuals, and 7.5% had someone living alone who was 65 years of age or older. The average household size was 2.67 and the average family size was 2.95.

24.2% of thepopulation were under the age of 18, 7.1% from 18 to 24, 27.2% from 25 to 44, 26.8% from 45 to 64 and 14.7% were 65 years of age or older. The median age was 39 years. For every 100 females, there were 106.6 males. For every 100 females age 18 and over, there were 101.9 males.

The median household income was $37,589 and the median family income was $42,750. Males had a median income of $35,000 females $25,500. The per capita income was $17,948.  About 6.3% of families and 7.9% of the population were below the poverty line, including 11.7% of those under age 18 and 3.6% of those age 65 or over.

References

Populated places established in 1800
Townships in Bradford County, Pennsylvania
Townships in Pennsylvania